Noardeast-Fryslân is a municipality of Friesland in the northern Netherlands. It was established 1 January 2019  and consists of the former municipalities of Dongeradeel, Ferwerderadiel and Kollumerland en Nieuwkruisland, all three of which dissolved on the same day. 

The municipality is located in the province of Friesland on the Wadden Sea coast, in the north of the Netherlands. Noardeast-Fryslân is bordered by the municipalities of Waadhoeke, Ameland, Schiermonnikoog, Leeuwarden, Dantumadiel and the province of Groningen. The population in January 2019 was 45,181. It is Friesland's seventh-most populous municipality. The largest population centre (2018 population, 12,576) is Dokkum. The residents speak West Frisian, a Dutch Low Saxon dialect or Dutch.

Part of the municipality are the Engelsmanplaat sandbank and most of the Rif sandbank (which is shared with Schiermonnikoog for a small part).

Etymology
The municipality is a part or corner in the northeast of the province of Friesland.

Population centres

The municipality consists of 53 settlements of which Dokkum is the seat of government. Noardeast-Fryslân is also a region that is experiencing population decline.

Sources: Dongeradeel.nl, Ferwerderadiel and Kollumerland.

Transportation
The ferry to Ameland departs from Holwert. Arriva runs several regional buses. Bus route 50 Leeuwarden-Dokkum-Lauwersoog connects with the departures of the ferry to Schiermonnikoog

Notable people

Public thinking and Public Service 

 Frederick of Hallum (ca.1113 in Hallum - 1175) Premonstratensian priest and saint
 Gemma Frisius (1508 in Dokkum – 1555) a Dutch physician, mathematician, cartographer, philosopher and instrument maker
 Johannes Saeckma (1572 in Kollum – 1636) a Dutch Golden Age magistrate and judge 
 Lieuwe van Aitzema (1600 in Dokkum – 1669) an historian, diplomat, bon viveur, libertine and spy 
 Johannes Phocylides Holwarda (1618 in Holwert - 1651) a Frisian astronomer, physician, and philosopher
 Hans Willem van Aylva (ca.1633 in Holwert - 1691) a soldier in the Dutch Raid on the Medway
 Balthasar Bekker (1634 in Mitselwier - 1698) a minister and author about philosophy and theology
 Ulrik Huber (1636 in Dokkum – 1694) professor of law and a political philosopher
 Dooitze Eelkes Hinxt (ca.1741 in Dokkum – 1797) a Dutch navy officer in the Battle of Camperdown 
 Gerardus Heymans  (1857 in Ferwert – 1930) a Dutch philosopher, psychologist, a follower of psychic monism
 Sybren van Tuinen (1913–1993) a Dutch politician and public servant, Mayor of Dokkumm 1946 - 1970
 Piet Gros (born 1962 in Dokkum) a Dutch chemist and professor biomacromolecular crystallography

The Arts 

 Govert Dircksz Camphuysen (1624 in Dokkum - 1672) an animal painter
 brother & sister Jacob Folkema (1692 in Dokkum – 1767) & Anna Folkema (1695 in Dokkum – 1768) engravers
 Bernard Accama (1697 in Burum – 1756) a Dutch historical and portrait painter
 Nienke van Hichtum (1860 in Nes – 1939) a Frisian Dutch children's author
 Watse Cuperus (1891 in Blije – 1966) a Dutch journalist, writer and translator
 Meindert DeJong (1906 in Wierum - 1991) an American writer of children's books
 Sipke Jan Bousema (born 1976 in Dokkum) a Dutch presenter and actor

Sport 
 Lou Dijkstra (1909 in Peazens – 1964) a Dutch speed skater, competed in the 1936 Winter Olympics 
 Klaas de Boer (born 1942 in Kollum) a retired U.S. soccer player and coach
 Jan Posthuma (born 1963 in Dokkum) a retired volleyball player, team silver medallist at the 1992 Summer Olympics and team gold medallist at the 1996 Summer Olympics

References

External links

 
Municipalities of Friesland
Municipalities of the Netherlands established in 2019